Snipes is a surname. Notable people with the surname include:

Angelo Snipes (born 1963), American football linebacker
Brenda Snipes (born 1943), American supervisor of elections in Florida
Renaldo Snipes (born 1956), American boxer
Roxy Snipes (1896–1941), American baseball player for the Chicago White Sox
Wesley Snipes (born 1962), American actor